Vinegar Syndrome is a film restoration and distribution company that specializes in "protecting and preserving genre films" by licensing and releasing them on home video. Founded in 2012 in Bridgeport, Connecticut by Joe Rubin and Ryan Emerson, the company's first home video release—first made available in 2013—was The Lost Films of Herschell Gordon Lewis, a DVD and Blu-ray release containing three films directed by Herschell Gordon Lewis, each of which were previously thought to be lost.

Since 2013, Vinegar Syndrome has released more than 300 films on DVD and Blu-ray. Their catalog includes cult and exploitation films in a number of different genres, including pornographic films, horror films, and action films. They have also released vinyl records of film soundtracks. Vinegar Syndrome has been favorably compared to the Criterion Collection, another film restoration and distribution company, and has received praise for the selection and quality of their catalog.

DVD and Blu-ray releases

Vinyl soundtrack releases

Notes

References

External links
 
 The Vinegar Syndrome Collector's Checklist, an official checklist of Vinegar Syndrome's catalog of releases (requires registration)

Lists of films by home video label
Film preservation